Armağan may refer to:

Armağan Dam, dam in Kırklareli Province, Turkey
Armağan Kuş (born 1992), Turkish footballer 
Eşref Armağan, Turkish painter
Armağan, Kemaliye

Turkish-language surnames
Turkish unisex given names